Elections were held in the organized municipalities in the Parry Sound District of Ontario on October 22, 2018 in conjunction with municipal elections across the province.

The Archipelago

Armour

Burk's Falls

Callander

Carling

Joly

Source:

Kearney

Source:

Machar

Magnetawan

Source:

McDougall

McKellar

Source:

McMurrich/Monteith

Source:

Nipissing

Parry Sound

Source:

Perry

Powassan

Ryerson

Source:

Seguin

Source:

South River

Strong

Source:

Sundridge

Source:

Whitestone

References

Parry Sound
Parry Sound District